Jørgen Jørgensen (16 March 1914 – 24 November 1961) was a Danish freestyle swimmer. He competed in three events at the 1936 Summer Olympics.

References

External links
 

1914 births
1961 deaths
Danish male freestyle swimmers
Olympic swimmers of Denmark
Swimmers at the 1936 Summer Olympics
Swimmers from Copenhagen